Zef Mirdita (Prizren, March 13, 1936 - Zagreb, April 4, 2016) was an Albanian historian, university professor and academic from Prizren, Kosovo. He has made a significant contribution to the fields of Illyrology and Balkan studies.

Biography 
Zef Mirdita was born in Prizren, where he completed his primary education, classical high school in Pazin and Zagreb, while he studied at the Catholic Faculty of Theology in Zagreb (1965). In 1966, he returned to his hometown as a professor at the high school in Prizren, where he taught history, sociology and French. He was engaged at the University of Pristina for the Latin language for students of history and Albanology, while in 1967 he was appointed assistant in the history department of the Faculty of Philosophy of the University of Prishtina.

In 1972, he defended his doctoral thesis at the University of Zagreb and specialized in "La Sapienza" University of Rome and then in Heidelberg (1976-1977) and Munich (1991-1992), Germany. In 1983, he was elected a full professor at University of Prishtina. He was a member of the National Committee of Yugoslavia (1980-1990) for Balkanology and a member of the Kosovo editorial board for the "Encyclopedia of Yugoslavia. In 1991 he was elected a corresponding member of the Academy of Sciences and Arts of Kosovo. 

In 1993, Mirdita left Kosovo and continued his scientific activity in Croatia, as a scientific advisor at the Institute of History (1993-1997) and then as a lecturer of ancient history at the University "J.J. Strossmayer" of Osjek, Croatia (1997-2007). He participated in many scientific congresses and lectured in several university centers as a guest professor. He is the author of a number of publications and a large number of scientific studies. He is the bearer of a number of recognitions and decorations for his contribution to the field of science. Mirdita is the author of a number of publications and a large number of scientific studies.

Selected publications 
 Studime dardane (Dardanian Studies), 1979 
  Antroponomia e Dardanisë në kohën romake &  Die Anthroponymie der Dardanien zur Römerzeit, 1981  
 Mitet dhe mitologjia në antikë (Myths and mythology in antiquity), 1988 
 Historia e kishës në popullin shqiptar (The history of the church in the Albanian people), 1994 
 Krishterimi ndër shqiptarët (Christianity among Albanians), 1998 
 Religjioni dhe kultet e dardanëve dhe Dardanisë në antikë (The religion and cults of the Dardanians and Dardania in antiquity), 2001 
  Vlasi u historiografiji (Vlachs in historiography), 2004  
  Dardanci i Dardanija u antici (Dardanians and Dardania in antiquity, 2016

See also 
 Illyria
 Balkan studies
 Kingdom of Dardania

References

External links 
 Zef Mirdita (Albanian)
 Zef Mirdita (Croatian)
 
 

1936 births
People from Prizren
Kosovan historians
Academic staff of the University of Pristina
2016 deaths
Members of the Academy of Sciences and Arts of Kosovo
Kosovan Roman Catholics
Albanian Roman Catholics